Erich Adam Oskar Dinges (20 November 1911 – 23 April 1953) was an SS-Sturmmann and member of staff at Auschwitz concentration camp. He was prosecuted at the Auschwitz Trial.

Dinges was born in Frankfurt am Main. He worked as a driving instructor. He joined the Nazi Party and the SS on 1 March 1932. From 30 May 1941 to November 1944 he was a chauffeur at Auschwitz.

Dinges was tried by the Supreme National Tribunal in Kraków and was sentenced to 5 years in prison on 22 December 1947. He was released from prison in 1952, after completing his sentence. Dinges died in 1953 under unknown circumstances.

Bibliography 
 Cyprian T., Sawicki J., Siedem wyroków Najwyższego Trybunału Narodowego, Poznań 1962

References 

1911 births
1953 deaths
People from Hesse-Nassau
People convicted in the Auschwitz trial
SS personnel
Auschwitz concentration camp personnel
Military personnel from Frankfurt
German people convicted of crimes against humanity